Institutiones may refer to several works:

 Institutes of Gaius, legal textbook, written about 161 AD
 Institutes of Justinian,  or "Justinian's Institutes", sixth century, largely based upon the Institutes of Gaius
 Institutiones Divinarum et Saecularium Litterarum, an encyclopedic work by Cassiodorus, sixth century
 Institutio canonicorum Aquisgranensis, Institutiones Aquisgranenses, the Instruction of canons of Aachen, disseminated in 816
 Institutiones calculi differentialis, Leonhard Euler, published 1755

See also
 Institute (disambiguation)
 The Institutes (disambiguation)